The New York Yankees are a Major League Baseball team.

New York Yankees may also refer to the following teams in other sports:

American football
Listed chronologically
New York Yankees (NFL), a team that played in the first American Football League (AFL) in 1926, before competing in the NFL from 1927 to 1929
New York Yankees (1936 AFL), a team that played in the second AFL, in 1936 and 1937 
New York Yankees (1940 AFL), a team that played in the third AFL, in 1940
 New York Yankees (1941), a short-lived member of the American Association (football)
New York Yankees (AAFC), which played during 1946–1949 in the All-America Football Conference

Other sports
New York Yankees (soccer), a team in the American Soccer League in 1931
New York Yankees (basketball), a team in the American Basketball League during the 1937–38 season